Dan Kelly McNeill (born July 23, 1946) is a retired four-star general in the United States Army. He served as Commander, Coalition Forces, Afghanistan from 2002 to 2003 and as Commanding General, U.S. Army Forces Command (FORSCOM) from 2004 to 2007. He then served as Commander, International Security Assistance Force (ISAF) in Afghanistan from February 1, 2007 to June 3, 2008.

According to Eurasianet, McNeill opposed the local ceasefires and economic development programs that had been favored by the outgoing NATO commander, British General David Richards. The attempted targeting of Taliban commander Abdul Ghafour, through aerial bombardment, on February 4, 2007, was seen as a sign of the policy changes McNeill wanted to introduce.

Officials in several European countries have quietly expressed concern about placing an American general in charge of the NATO force. Richards tried to create a less harsh, more economic-development-oriented identity for NATO in Afghanistan, as compared to the "kicking-down-doors" image that US forces have. Many local analysts expect NATO forces to embrace a more aggressive stance under McNeill, who is believed to oppose the type of local peace arrangements that Richards promoted. The danger at this point is that an overly aggressive NATO force in Afghanistan could alienate Afghans, and thus cause the Taliban’s support base to grow.

McNeill was featured in the Academy award-winning documentary Taxi to the Dark Side (2007). The film captured McNeil refusing to admit 'any blunt force trauma' that caused Dilawar's death, despite the fact that the certificate of death had already stated 'Homicide'.

Awards and decorations
His awards and decorations included the

See also

References

1946 births
Living people
People from Warsaw, North Carolina
United States Army personnel of the War in Afghanistan (2001–2021)
United States Army generals
Recipients of the Distinguished Service Medal (US Army)
Recipients of the Legion of Merit
North Carolina State University alumni
Recipients of the Defense Superior Service Medal
Recipients of the Defense Distinguished Service Medal